Dillagi is a 1978 romantic comedy directed by Basu Chatterjee, based on the Bengali novella "Kalidas O Chemistry" (কালিদাস ও কেমিস্ট্রি) by Bimal Kar.

It stars Dharmendra playing Swarn Kamal - a newly appointed Sanskrit professor in a girls' college. Hema Malini is a strict Chemistry lecturer (Phoolrenu) and warden of the same college.

Synopsis 
Phoolrenu has been nicknamed "carbon dioxide" and Swarnkamal is lovingly called "jijaji" by the girls. While for Swarnkamal it is love at first sight, Phoolrenu detests him due to his style of teaching the works of Mahakavi (Great Poet) Kalidas.

From the celebrations of the festival - Holi to the Annual function, all attempts of Swarnkamal to win over Phoolrenu seem to be having an opposite effect. He then visits Phoolrenu during the summer vacations at her hometown of Kashipur and finally makes some headway, but Phoolrenu wants him to approach her through a proper channel by responding to her matrimonial advertisement in a newspaper.

But confusion reigns and Phoolrenu's marriage is fixed with someone else. Will Swarnkamal be able to make it to the wedding in time and clear the chaos. Watch this sublime comedy to find out.

Cast 
Dharmendra – Swarn Kamal
Hema Malini – Phoolrenu
Mithu Mukherjee – Geeta, English Lecturer
Devan Verma – Gopal Krishan Choudhry
Asrani – Ramesh
Preeti Ganguly – Charu, Student
Keshto Mukherjee – Tonga (horse-coach) driver
Shatrughan Sinha – Advocate Shekhar
Guffi Paintal – Ganesh
Urmila Bhatt – Ramesh's mother
Lalita Kumari – Principal
Dulari  – Ganga
Brahmachari – Mini-bus driver
Kajri – Usha
Anjali Paigankar – Shobha
Poornima Jairam
Ritu Kamal
Manjita
Shobhna Shah
Rajan Kapoor
Manek Chaudhary
Qamar Khan
Beena Bawa
Geetanjali

Credits 
Director – Basu Chatterjee
Producer – Bikram Singh Dehal, Kanwar Ajit Singh
Screenplay – Basu Chatterjee, Keka Chatterjee
Dialogue – Basu Chatterjee
Cinematographer – K. K. Mahajan
Editor – V. N. Mayekar
Art Director – Jadhav Bhattacharya
Costumes Designer – Leena Daru, Tulsiram Nipane
Action Director – Ravi Khanna
Choreographer – Satyanarayan
Music Director – Rajesh Roshan
Lyricist – Yogesh
Playback Singers – Kishore Kumar, Lata Mangeshkar, Nitin Mukesh, Suman Kalyanpur

Soundtrack

External links

1978 films
1970s Hindi-language films
Films directed by Basu Chatterjee
1978 romantic comedy films
Films scored by Rajesh Roshan
Films based on Indian novels